Harold Crawshaw (18 February 1912 – 1971) was an English footballer who played in the Football League for Mansfield Town, Nottingham Forest and Portsmouth.

References

1912 births
1975 deaths
English footballers
English Football League players
Ashington A.F.C. players
Portsmouth F.C. players
Mansfield Town F.C. players
Nottingham Forest F.C. players
Association football forwards